Neil Boyd (3 June 1915 – 21 June 1990) was an  Australian rules footballer who played with Fitzroy in the Victorian Football League (VFL).

Notes

External links 
		

1915 births
1990 deaths
Australian rules footballers from Victoria (Australia)
Fitzroy Football Club players